Eliseo Rodríguez Delgado (born May 24, 1946) is a Puerto Rican former professional baseball catcher. He played in Major League Baseball (MLB) from 1968 to 1976 for the New York Yankees, Kansas City Royals, Milwaukee Brewers, California Angels, and Los Angeles Dodgers.

Career
His professional baseball career began in 1964 when he was signed by the Kansas City Athletics as an amateur free agent after graduating from  James Monroe High School in Bronx, NY. He spent the 1964 in the rookie and A-class Minor league baseball teams of the Athletics. at the end of the season, on November 30, 1964, he was drafted by the New York Yankees from the Athletics in the 1964 first-year player draft. Rodríguez spent the next few years moving up the Yankees farm system, eventually making it to the AAA-level Syracuse Chiefs in 1967. A year later, Rodríguez made his major league debut for the Yankees.

Rodríguez debuted for the Yankees on May 26, 1968, against the Chicago White Sox. He played nine games over the course of the season while also spending time in Syracuse as well. On October 15, 1968, Rodríguez was drafted by the Kansas City Royals from the New York Yankees as the 13th pick in the 1968 MLB expansion draft. In his first season with the expansion Royals, he made his first all-star appearance, though he did not play in the game. He finished the season with a batting average of .236 in 95 games. The following season he split time at catcher with Ed Kirkpatrick.

On February 2, 1971, after the end of the 1970 Kansas City Royals season , the Royals traded Rodríguez to the Milwaukee Brewers for Carl Taylor. He regained his starting role as the 1971 Milwaukee Brewers season began. Rodríguez played 115 games in 1971, yet only had a batting average of .210. He played 116 games the following season en route to his second all-star game, which he also did not play in. He finished the season with a career high batting average of .285 and over 100 hits.

After splitting time at catcher with Darrell Porter the following season, Rodríguez was involved in a nine-player transaction when he was sent along with Ollie Brown, Joe Lahoud, Skip Lockwood and Gary Ryerson from the Brewers to the California Angels for Steve Barber, Clyde Wright, Ken Berry, Art Kusnyer and cash on October 23, 1973. Rodríguez ended up having a breakout year in 1974. He had a fielding percentage of .992, played a career high 140 games, and hit a career high seven home runs. During the 1974 California Angels season, Rodríguez tied an American League record with 19 putouts in a nine-inning game and set another with 21 in an extra-inning game. The following season, he played 90 games as catcher, and caught Nolan Ryan's fourth no-hitter.

On March 31, 1976, he was traded by the California Angels to the Los Angeles Dodgers for Orlando Alvarez and cash, and spent one season with the Dodgers before being released on May 2, 1977.

Rodríguez is now a player development consultant for The Atlantic League of Professional Baseball and is in charge of scouting Latin America for the league.
He was later announced as manager for the 2018 Road Warriors, a traveling team that will temporarily replace the folded Bridgeport Bluefish in the Atlantic League.

See also
List of players from Puerto Rico in Major League Baseball

References

External links

1946 births
Living people
Acereros de Monclova players
American League All-Stars
Binghamton Triplets players
Cafeteros de Córdoba players
California Angels players
Columbus Clippers players
Columbus Confederate Yankees players
Daytona Beach Islanders players
Greensboro Yankees players
Kansas City Royals players
Los Angeles Dodgers players
Major League Baseball catchers
Major League Baseball players from Puerto Rico
Milwaukee Brewers players
Mexican League baseball managers
New York Yankees players
People from Fajardo, Puerto Rico
Puerto Rican expatriate baseball players in Mexico
Saraperos de Saltillo players
Syracuse Chiefs players
Wytheville A's players